The Apodinae are a subfamily of swifts and contain the following species:

Tribe Collocaliini - swiftlets
 Genus Collocalia
 Plume-toed swiftlet (Collocalia affinis)
 Grey-rumped swiftlet (Collocalia marginata)
 Ridgetop swiftlet (Collocalia isonota)
 Tenggara swiftlet (Collocalia sumbawae)
 Drab swiftlet (Collocalia neglecta)
 Glossy swiftlet (Collocalia esculenta)
 Subspecies: C. e. affinis, C. e. elachyptera, C. e. cyanoptila, C. e. vanderbilti, C. e. oberholseri,  C. e. natalis, C. e. septentrionalis, C. e. isonota, C. e. marginata, C. e. bagobo, C. e. spilura,  C. e. manadensis, C. e. esculenta, C. e. minuta, C. e. sumbawae, C. e. perneglecta, C. e. neglecta,  C. e. amethystina, C. e. erwini, C. e. numforensis, C. e. nitens, C. e. misimae, C. e. stresemanni,  C. e. heinrothi, C. e. spilogaster, C. e. tametamele, C. e. becki, C. e. makirensis, C. e. desiderata,  C. e. uropygialis, & C. e. albidior
 Satin swiftlet (Collocalia uropygialis)
 Bornean swiftlet (Collocalia dodgei)
 Cave swiftlet (Collocalia linchi)
 Subspecies: C. l. ripleyi, C. l. dodgei, C. l. linchi, & C. l. dedii
 Christmas Island swiftlet (Collocalia natalis)
 Pygmy swiftlet (Collocalia troglodytes)
 Genus Aerodramus sometimes included in Collocalia
 Seychelles swiftlet (Aerodramus elaphrus)
 Mascarene swiftlet (Aerodramus francicus)
 Indian swiftlet (Aerodramus unicolor)
 Philippine swiftlet (Aerodramus mearnsi)
 Moluccan swiftlet (Aerodramus infuscatus)
 Subspecies: A. i. sororum, A. i. infuscatus, & A. i. ceramensis
 Sulawesi swiftlet (Aerodramus sororum)
 Seram swiftlet (Aerodramus ceramensis)
 Mountain swiftlet (Aerodramus hirundinaceus)
 Subspecies: A. h. baru, A. h. excelsus, & A. h. hirundinaceus
 White-rumped swiftlet (Aerodramus spodiopygius)
 Subspecies: A. s. delichon, A. s. eichhorni, A. s. noonaedanae, A. s. reichenowi, A. s. desolatus,  A. s. epiensis, A. s. ingens, A. s. leucopygius, A. s. assimilis, A. s. townsendi, & A. s. spodiopygius
 Australian swiftlet (Aerodramus terraereginae)
 Subspecies: A. t. terraereginae, & A. t. chillagoensis
 Himalayan swiftlet (Aerodramus brevirostris)
  Subspecies: A. b. brevirostris, A. b. innominatus, & A. b. rogersi
 Indochinese swiftlet (Aerodramus rogersi) sometimes included in A. brevirostris
 Volcano swiftlet (Aerodramus vulcanorum) sometimes included in A. brevirostris
 Whitehead's swiftlet (Aerodramus whiteheadi)
 Subspecies: A. w. whiteheadi, & A. w. origenis
 Bare-legged swiftlet (Aerodramus nuditarsus)
 Mayr's swiftlet (Aerodramus orientalis)
 Subspecies: A. o. leletensis, & A. o. orientalis
 Palawan swiftlet (Aerodramus palawanensis)
 Mossy-nest swiftlet (Aerodramus salangana) sometimes included in A. vanikorensis   
 Subspecies: A. s. natunae, A. s. maratua, A. s. aerophilus, & A. s. salangana 
 Uniform swiftlet (Aerodramus vanikorensis)
 Subspecies: A. v. amelis, A. v. palawanensis, A. v. aenigma, A. v. heinrichi, A. v. moluccarum,  A. v. waigeuensis, A. v. steini, A. v. yorki, A. v. tagulae, A. v. coultasi, A. v. pallens, A. v. lihirensis,  A. v. lugubris, & A. v. vanikorensis
 Palau swiftlet (Aerodramus pelewensis)
 Mariana swiftlet (Aerodramus bartschi)
 Island swiftlet (Aerodramus inquietus)
 Subspecies: A. i. rukensis, A. i. ponapensis, & A. i. inquietus
 Atiu swiftlet (Aerodramus sawtelli)
 Tahiti swiftlet (Aerodramus leucophaeus)
 Subspecies: A. l. leucophaeus, A. l. ocistus, & A. l. gilliardi
 Marquesan swiftlet (Aerodramus ocistus)
 Black-nest swiftlet (Aerodramus maximus)
 Subspecies: A. m. maximus, A. m. lowi, & A. m. tichelmani
 Edible-nest swiftlet (Aerodramus fuciphagus)
 Subspecies: A. f. amechanus, A. f. germani, A. f. inexpectatus, A. f. vestitus, A. f. perplexus,  A. f. fuciphagus, A. f. dammermani, & A. f. micans
 Germain's swiftlet (Aerodramus germani)
 Three-toed swiftlet (Aerodramus papuensis)
 Genus Hydrochous
 Giant swiftlet (Hydrochous gigas)
 Genus Schoutedenapus - African swiftlets
 Scarce swift (Schoutedenapus myoptilus)
 Subspecies: S. m. poensis, S. m. chapini, & S. m. myoptilus
Tribe Chaeturini - needletails
 Genus Mearnsia
 Philippine spine-tailed swift (Mearnsia picina)   
 Papuan spine-tailed swift (Mearnsia novaeguineae)
  Subspecies: M. n. buergersi, & M. n. novaeguineae
 Genus Zoonavena 
 Madagascar spinetail (Zoonavena grandidieri)
 Subspecies: Z. g. grandidieri, & Z. g. mariae
 São Tomé spinetail (Zoonavena thomensis)
 White-rumped spinetail (Zoonavena sylvatica)
 Genus Telacanthura 
 Black spinetail (Telacanthura melanopygia)
 Mottled spinetail (Telacanthura ussheri)
 Subspecies: T. u. ussheri, T. u. sharpei, T. u. stictilaema, & T. u. benguellensis 
 Genus Rhaphidura 
 Silver-rumped spinetail (Rhaphidura leucopygialis)
 Sabine's spinetail (Rhaphidura sabini)
 Genus Neafrapus
 Böhm's spinetail (Neafrapus boehmi)
 Subspecies: N. b. boehmi, & N. b. sheppardi
 Cassin's spinetail (Neafrapus cassini)
 Genus Hirundapus 
 White-throated needletail (Hirundapus caudacutus)
 Subspecies: H. c. caudacutus, & H. c. nudipes
 Purple needletail (Hirundapus celebensis)
 Silver-backed needletail (Hirundapus cochinchinensis)
 Subspecies: H. c. rupchandi, H. c. cochinchinensis, & H. c. formosanus
 Brown-backed needletail (Hirundapus giganteus)
 Subspecies: H. g. indicus, & H. g. giganteus
 Genus Chaetura 
 Band-rumped swift (Chaetura spinicauda)
 Subspecies: C. s. aetherodroma, & C. s. spinicaudus
 Lesser Antillean swift (Chaetura martinica)
 Gray-rumped swift (Chaetura cinereiventris)
 Subspecies: C. c. phaeopygos, C. c. occidentalis, C. c. schistacea, C. c. lawrencei, C. c. guianensis,  C. c. sclateri, & C. c. cinereiventris
 Pale-rumped swift (Chaetura egregia)
 Chimney swift (Chaetura pelagica)
 Vaux's swift (Chaetura vauxi)
 Subspecies: C. v. vauxi, C. v. tamaulipensis, C. v. gaumeri, C. v. warneri, C. v. richmondi,  C. v. ochropygia, & C. v. andrei
 Chapman's swift (Chaetura chapmani)
 Mato Grosso swift (Chaetura viridipennis)
 Short-tailed swift (Chaetura brachyura)
 Subspecies: C. b. brachyura, C. b. praevelox, C. b. cinereocauda, &  C. b. ocypetes
 Sick's swift (Chaetura meridionalis)
 Costa Rican swift (Chaetura fumosa)
Tribe Apodini - typical swifts
 Genus Aeronautes 
 White-throated swift (Aeronautes saxatalis)
 Subspecies: A. s. saxatalis, & A. s. nigrior
 White-tipped swift (Aeronautes montivagus)
 Subspecies: A. m. montivagus, & A. m. tatei
 Andean swift (Aeronautes andecolus)
 Subspecies: A. a. parvulus, A. a. peruvianus, & A. a. andecolus

 Genus Tachornis 
 Pygmy palm swift (Tachornis furcata)
 Subspecies: T. f. nigrodorsalis, & T. f. furcata
 Fork-tailed palm swift (Tachornis squamata)
 Subspecies: T. s. semota, & T. s. squamata
 Antillean palm-swift (Tachornis phoenicobia)
 Subspecies: T. p. iradii, &  T. p. phoenicobia

 Genus Panyptila 
 Great swallow-tailed swift (Panyptila sanctihieronymi)
 Lesser swallow-tailed swift (Panyptila cayennensis)
 Subspecies: P. c. veraecrucis, & P. c. cayennensis
 Genus Cypsiurus 
 Asian palm swift (Cypsiurus balasiensis)
 Subspecies: C. b. balasiensis, C. b. infumatus, C. b. bartelsorum, & C. b. pallidior
 African palm swift (Cypsiurus parvus)
 Subspecies: C. p. parvus, C. p. brachypterus, C. p. myochrous, C. p. laemostigma, C. p. hyphaenes,  C. p. celer, & C. p. gracilis
 Malagasy palm swift (Cypsiurus gracilis)
 Subspecies: C. g. gracilis, C. g. griveaudi
 Genus Tachymarptis 
Alpine swift (Tachymarptis melba)
 Subspecies: T. m. melba, T. m. tuneti, T. m. archeri, T. m. maximus, T. m. africanus, T. m. marjoriae,  T. m. willsi, T. m. nubifugus, T. m. dorabtatai, & T. m. bakeri
 Mottled swift (Tachymarptis aequatorialis)
 Subspecies: T. a. lowei, T. a. bamendae, T. a. furensis, T. a. aequatorialis, & T. a. gelidus
 Genus Apus 
 Cape Verde swift (Apus alexandri)
 Common swift (Apus apus)
 Subspecies: A. a. apus, & A. a. pekinensis

 Plain swift (Apus unicolor)
 Nyanza swift (Apus niansae)
 Subspecies: A. n. niansae, & A. n. somalicus
 Pallid swift (Apus pallidus)
 Subspecies: A. p. brehmorum, A. p. illyricus, & A. p. pallidus
 African black swift (Apus barbatus)
 Subspecies: A. b. glanvillei, A. b. serlei, A. b. roehli, A. b. hollidayi, A. b. oreobates,  & A. b. barbatus
 Forbes-Watson's swift (Apus berliozi)
 Subspecies: A. b. berliozi, & A. b. bensoni
 Bradfield's swift (Apus bradfieldi)
 Subspecies: A. b. bradfieldi, & A. b. deserticola
 Malagasy black swift (Apus balstoni)
 Subspecies: A. b. mayottensis, & A. b. balstoni
 Pacific swift (Apus pacificus)
 Subspecies: A. p. pacificus, A. p. kurodae, A. p. salimali, A. p. leuconyx, & A. p. cooki
 Salim Ali's swift (Apus salimalii)
 Blyth's swift (Apus leuconyx)
 Cook's swift (Apus cooki)
 Dark-rumped swift (Apus acuticauda)
 Little swift (Apus affinis)
 Subspecies: A. a. galilejensis, A. a. aerobates, A. a. bannermani, A. a. theresae, A. a. affinis,  & A. a. singalensis
 House swift (Apus nipalensis)
 Subspecies: A. n. nipalensis, A. n. subfurcatus, A. n. furcatus, & A. n. kuntzi
 Horus swift (Apus horus)
 Subspecies: A. h. horus, & A. h. fuscobrunneus
 White-rumped swift (Apus caffer)
 Bates's swift (Apus batesi)
 Fernando Po swift (Apus sladeniae)

References

External links

Apodidae
Bird subfamilies